The Serpent (Italian:La serpe) is a 1920 Italian silent film directed by Roberto Roberti and starring Francesca Bertini.

Cast
 Francesca Bertini 
 Vittorio Bianchi 
 Luigi Cigoli
 Emma Farnesi 
 Raoul Maillard 
 Duilio Marrazzi
 Sandro Salvini

References

Bibliography
 Abel, Richard. Encyclopedia of Early Cinema. Taylor & Francis, 2005.

External links

1920 films
1920s Italian-language films
Films directed by Roberto Roberti
Italian silent feature films
Italian black-and-white films